The Selmer Cabinet governed Norway between 11 October 1880 and 1 March 1884. It was led by Christian Selmer. All but three of the cabinet's ministers were impeached after a dispute about whether or not the cabinet should be required to meet in the Storting. This decision effectively led to the introduction of parliamentarism in Norway. The impeachment of the Selmer Cabinet was also the last time a Norwegian politician was convicted after being impeached, as Prime Minister Abraham Berge was found not guilty after his 1926 impeachment.

Cabinet Members

References

Cabinet of Norway